Burrows Cave is the name given to an alleged cave site in  Southern Illinois reputedly discovered in 1982 by Russell E. Burrows. Burrows says it contained a number of artifacts. Through the many inconsistencies and implausibilities that revolve around Russell E. Burrows' story of discovery and its findings, the cave and its contents are considered a hoax by mainstream archaeologists.

Location
At the time of the discovery, the alleged cave was supposed to be located in Richland County somewhere near the town of Olney, Illinois, where Burrows resided at the time. Burrows claimed that he did not want to give away the location of the cave because he believed that the cave would be robbed of its ancient treasures.

Discovery
Burrows says he discovered the cave while hiking along the hillside miles away from the Ohio River, where he later claimed that he was searching for buckles from the Civil War era and pioneer horseshoes with his metal detector. Burrows says that he came across a hole into which he fell that led him into the mysterious cave full of priceless ancient artifacts. The cave was said to have contained numerous archaeological artifacts, including carvings, coins, and other items. Many of the purported artifacts are said to have inscriptions in various ancient languages such as Phoenician and Iberian, but the inscriptions are generally meaningless.

Cave as "tomb"
Burrows claims that the cave is a tomb holding the artifacts and remains of 13 crypts. To date, nobody outside Burrows's immediate circle has claimed to have been inside the cave, and many of the so-called artifacts have been revealed as forgeries. The cave and its artifacts are widely considered to be a hoax or fraud,
 even among proponents of other pseudoarchaeological theories such as Barry Fell. The idea has gained some traction within proponents of Mormon archaeology and hyperdiffusionism advocates such as Frank Collin (writing as Frank Joseph).

Media
Burrows and the cave were one of the subjects of the second season "Grand Canyon Treasure" episode  of America Unearthed and the show Holy Grail in America, both produced by the History Channel.

Thomas Emerson, the Illinois state archaeologist and former head of the Illinois Historic Preservation Agency, warned that the claims being made by Burrows cave proponents were sensational, and not backed by evidence.

With no evidence of the cave and its existence, many archaeologists quickly dismissed Burrows and the alleged cave.

Phoenician ship scenario
Until about 1993, the predominant Burrows Cave scenario involved Phoenician and Libyan (North African) colonists. Part of the evidence for this involved a stone tablet supposedly depicting a Phoenician vessel. Frank Joseph, one of the key figures involved with the cave, reproduced this in his book The Lost Treasure of King Juba: The Evidence of Africans in America before Columbus alongside an image of an actual Phoenician vessel that had been used by an associate of Burrows who had originally identified it as Phoenician. In doing so he cropped the image from the Burrows stone making the paddle end of a steering oar unidentifiable but leaving the steering oars that are shown on what he calls (and the artist depicts) as the prow of the boat.

The anthropologist and geographer George F. Carter, a supporter of the concept of trans-cultural diffusion, commented on the image saying 
"The 'author' did not recognize the paired oars, and hung an 'impossible' oar over the bow. All others equally botched up. Fanciful stern pieces...Oar over bow - crude fakery by an ignoramus in the world of ships."

Dating
The image used to identify the ship as Phoenician actually is dated to around 700 BCE, but Joseph described it as dated 170 BCE, possibly because around this time Burrows Cave was being portrayed as the destination of Mauretanians, including "exiled Romans, Africans, Celts, Christians and Jews" fleeing the Romans taking with them a supposed treasure belonging to King Juba II.

References

External links
 Falling into Burrows Cave 
 2013 Burrows Cave update 
 Burrows Cave: A Modern Hoax
 Digging  Burrow's Cave

Hoaxes in the United States
Pseudoarchaeology
Marion County, Illinois
Archaeological forgeries
Richland County, Illinois
Mormon apologetics
Hyperdiffusionism